Nuxt.js is a free and open source JavaScript library based on Vue.js, Node.js, Webpack and Babel.js. Nuxt is inspired by Next.js, which is a framework of similar purpose, based on React.js.

The framework is advertised as a "Meta-framework for universal applications". The term universal is used here with the meaning that the goal of the framework is to enable users to create web views in JavaScript utilizing the Vue.js single file component system and that can function both as in-browser single page application (SPA) views as well as server-rendered web views which are then (after server rendering) "rehydrated" to full SPA functionality. Additionally, the framework enables users to have the content, or parts of it, fully pre-rendered on the server and served in the manner of static site generators.

The benefits of this approach are, among others, reduced time to interactivity and improved SEO compared to SPAs, due to the fact that full contents of each page are being served by the web server before any client-side JavaScript is executed. Put alternatively, one can maintain both the benefits of traditional server-side rendered HTML pages, and improved interactivity and advanced user interface of SPAs. The core benefit of the Nuxt.js framework itself is that it makes the configuration and setup of such applications simplified and seamless to the application developer, who can simply develop UI portions of the application as if it were a more common Vue.js single file application. NuxtJS version 3.0 has been announced by the developers.

See also 
 Vue.js
 JavaScript framework

References

External links 
 Nuxt.js website
 Nuxt.js on GitHub

Web frameworks
Free static website generators